The 2016–17 Moldovan Women Top League season in association football was the 17th since its establishment. A total of 8 teams contested the league. The season began on 3 September 2016 and ended on 4 June 2017.ARF Criuleni were the defending champions, but withdrawn their team from the league on 13 October 2016 and their results from this season were annulled.

Stadia and locations

Format
The schedule consists of three rounds. During the first two rounds, each team plays each other once home and away for a total of 12 matches. The pairings of the third round will then be set according to the standings after the first two rounds, giving every team a third game against each opponent for a total of 18 games per team.

League table

Results

First and second round

Third round

References

External links
Women Top League - Moldova - Results, fixtures, tables - FMF
League at uefa.com

Moldovan Women Top League 2016-17
Moldovan Women Top League seasons
2016–17 domestic women's association football leagues